Mundel (also called Mundalama) is a village located in the Puttalam District.

References

Populated places in North Western Province, Sri Lanka
Populated places in Puttalam District